Crispin or Krispin (died after 1193) was a prelate in the Kingdom of Hungary in the late 12th century, who served as Bishop of Csanád (now Cenad in Romania) from 1192 until around 1193/98.

Career
Crispin was elected Bishop of Csanád in 1192, when his predecessor Saul Győr elevated into the position of Archbishop of Kalocsa. He first appeared in this dignity as a signatory of a royal charter in that year, when King Béla III of Hungary donated three duty-free salt-carrying vessels to the Pannonhalma Abbey. Crispin was again referred to as bishop in 1193, when Bartholomew of Krk was granted Modruš by Béla III. This is the last piece of information about Crispin. His earliest known successor John was elected Bishop of Csanád in 1198.

References

Sources 

 
 

12th-century Hungarian people
Bishops of Csanád
12th-century Roman Catholic bishops in Hungary